Desert Inn Road, also known as Wilbur Clark D. I. Road, is a major west-east road in the Las Vegas metropolitan area, Nevada, United States, part of the Las Vegas grid road system. It is named after the former Desert Inn hotel and casino.

Desert Inn Expressway
For the majority of its route, Desert Inn Road is a regular street with residential, commercial, and industrial areas along it, but it features a 2½ mile expressway portion in the Las Vegas Strip with grade separations and partial interchanges officially called the Desert Inn Road Super Arterial (also commonly referred to as the Desert Inn Expressway (DIE)), acting as a border for Paradise and Winchester. Construction of the expressway was completed in 1996 with a cost of US$84 million. It is primarily used as a Las Vegas Strip traffic avoidance route, passing over Interstate 15 and under Las Vegas Boulevard.

Route
Desert Inn Road is disconnected from all freeways it crosses, with bridges over Clark County 215 (CC 215; Bruce Woodbury Beltway) and I-15 and is overpassed by I-515/US 93/US 95. It is also disconnected from Las Vegas Boulevard, with a tunnel passing under it, which makes it the only major east–west surface street on the Strip to not intersect with Las Vegas Boulevard.

Desert Inn Road begins in Summerlin South at Red Rock Ranch Road before crossing over CC 215 with no direct access and then crossing Hualapai Way and entering Las Vegas. The road crosses NV 595 (Rainbow Boulevard) and NV 596 (Jones Boulevard) and eventually crosses Valley View Boulevard where the Desert Inn Road Super Arterial expressway begins.

The Desert Inn Expressway begins with driveways and minor roads connecting to it before forming a partial interchange (eastbound exit, westbound entrance) at Rancho Drive. A right-in/right-out (RIRO) on the eastbound side connects the expressway to Highland Drive, Western Avenue, and Spring Mountain Road before the expressway crosses Highland Drive, the Union Pacific Railroad, and Sammy Davis Drive. The Desert Inn Expressway then lowers from the viaduct to pass through a tunnel under Las Vegas Boulevard where an eastbound entrance ramp leading from Wynn Boulevard connects. The expressway then crosses a signalized intersection with Paradise Road before it passes under the Las Vegas Monorail and Las Vegas Convention Center before terminating at the intersection with University Center Drive and Joe W. Brown Drive where Desert Inn Road continues east as a standard arterial road.

Eventually, Desert Inn Road passes under I-515/US 93/US 95 and then intersects NV 582 (Boulder Highway) where it continues north as Lamb Boulevard, creating a short gap in the route. Desert Inn Road restarts off Lamb Boulevard and continues east then crosses NV 612 (Nellis Boulevard). Near its eastern terminus, the road crosses a bridge over the Las Vegas Wash, which opened on September 19, 2022 and connected two dead-end segments of Desert Inn Road.

Major intersections

Places along Desert Inn Road
The following are sorted by west-east location along Desert Inn Road.

 The Alexander Dawson School at Rainbow Mountain
 Desert Breeze Park (access via Durango Drive)
 Trump International Hotel Las Vegas (no direct access from Desert Inn Road)
 Resorts World Las Vegas (no direct access from Desert Inn Road)
 Encore Las Vegas (no direct access from Desert Inn Road)
 Las Vegas Convention Center (access via Paradise Road)
 Sunrise Hospital & Medical Center (access via Maryland Parkway)
 Las Vegas National Golf Club
 Boulder Station (access via Boulder Highway and Lamb Boulevard)

References

Streets in Las Vegas
Streets in the Las Vegas Valley
Spring Valley, Nevada
Whitney, Nevada